The following television stations broadcast on digital or analog channel 10 in Canada:

Alberta
 CFCN-TV-6 in Drumheller, Alberta

British Columbia
 CFJC-TV-12 in Nicola, British Columbia
 CKPG-TV-1 in Hixon, British Columbia

New Brunswick
 CKAM-TV-1 in Newcastle, New Brunswick
 CKAM-TV-2 in Chatham, New Brunswick
 CKAM-TV-4 in Doaktown, New Brunswick

Nova Scotia
 CIHF-TV-9 in Shelburne, Nova Scotia
 CIMC-TV in Isle Madame, Nova Scotia
 CJCH-TV-1 in Canning, Nova Scotia

Ontario
 CFPL-DT in London, Ontario
 CITO-TV-1 in Kapuskasing, Ontario
 CKNY-TV in North Bay, Ontario

Quebec
 CFEM-DT-1 in Val d'Or, Quebec
 CFTM-DT in Montreal, Quebec
 CHAU-DT-3 in Port-Daniel-Gascons, Quebec
 CJPM-TV-1 in Roberval, Quebec

Saskatchewan
 CICC-TV in Yorkton, Saskatchewan
 CIPA-TV-1 in Alticane, Saskatchewan
 CKMC-TV-1 in Golden Prairie, Saskatchewan

10 TV stations in Canada